The Waukesha School District is a school district that serves the city of Waukesha and parts of the Village of Waukesha, Town of Brookfield, city of Brookfield, and city of Pewaukee in Waukesha County, Wisconsin. The district serves over 14,000 students and administers three high schools, three middle schools, 15 elementary schools, and four charter schools. It is governed by a board of nine members.

History 
In 2019, Blair Elementary School was  closed out and Butler Middle School is now divided into two separate campuses, Butler Campus and Blair Campus. Both campuses run on different schedules.

Student lunch program 
In August 2021, the Waukesha School Board voted to not participate in the Seamless Summer Option, a United States Department of Agriculture (USDA) universal student lunch program that was extended for the 2021-2022 school year because of the COVID-19 pandemic. Families could still apply for the need-based National School Lunch program. This decision drew widespread criticism. The school board later reversed its decision, voting to participate in the Seamless Summer Option program.

Elementary School Closing of 2022 
On March 10, 2022, the district has approved and agreed to close down Whittier Elementary School and merge with Hadfield Elementary School. It was intended for the district to limit the decrease of student populations, improve accessibility for students with special needs, and to combat a $7 million budget shortfall for the 2022-2023 school year.

Schools
The district operates the following schools.

Elementary schools
Banting Elementary School
Bethesda Elementary School
Hadfield Elementary School
Hawthorne Elementary School
Heyer Elementary School
Hillcrest Elementary School
Lowell Elementary School
Meadowbrook Elementary School
Prairie Elementary School
Randall Elementary School (Waukesha STEM Academy)
Rose Glen Elementary School
Summit View Elementary School
Whittier Elementary School (closing)

Middle schools
 Butler Middle School
Blair Campus
 Horning Middle School
Les Paul (Central) Middle School
Saratoga STEM Middle School

High schools
Waukesha North High School
Waukesha South High School
Waukesha West High School
Waukesha East Alternative School

Charter schools
 Waukesha Engineering Preparatory Academy
 Waukesha Academy of Health Professions
 Waukesha STEM Academy
 Harvey Philip Alternative High School

Closed Schools 

 Blair Elementary School
 Whittier Elementary School

References

External links
 

School districts in Wisconsin
Education in Waukesha County, Wisconsin